is a railway station in Arita, Saga, Japan, jointly operated by Kyushu Railway Company (JR Kyushu) and the third-sector Matsuura Railway and is a transfer station between the Sasebo Line and the Nishi-Kyushu Line.

Lines 

The station is also the terminus for the Matsuura Railway Nishi-Kyushu Line.

Layout
The station consists of a side platform and an island platform serving three tracks. Platforms 1 (side platform) and 2 (on the island) are used by Sasebo Line trains while platform 3 (also on the island), whose track is a dead-end siding, is used by Nishi-Kyushu Line trains. A through-track runs between the two platforms.

The station building is a modern structure with a distinctive circular skylight. It houses a waiting area, staffed ticket windows for both JR Kyushu and the Matsuura Railway, an Arita tourist information centre and a cafe. Access to the island platform from the station building is by means of a footbridge. Paid parking is available at the station forecourt and car rentals are available.

Management of the JR facilities at the station has been outsourced to the JR Kyushu Tetsudou Eigyou Co., a wholly owned subsidiary of JR Kyushu specialising in station services. It staffs the ticket counter which is equipped with a Midori no Madoguchi facility.

Platforms

Adjacent stations 

|-
|colspan=5 style="text-align:center;" |JR Kyushu

|-
|colspan=5 style="text-align:center;" |Matsuura Railway

History
In the next phase of expansion, the track was extended further west with Haiki opening as the new western terminus on 10 July 1897. Arita was opened on the same day as an intermediate station on the new track.

On 7 August 1898, the private Imari Railway opened a track from Imari with Arita as its southern terminus. The Imari Railway merged with the Kyushu Railway on 28 December the same year.

The Kyushu Railway was nationalized on 1 July 1907 and Japanese Government Railways (JGR) took over control of the station. On 1 March 1945, the track to Imari was designated as part of the Matsuura Line. With the privatization of Japanese National Railways (JNR), the successor of JGR, on 1 April 1987, control of the station passed to JR Kyushu. On 1 April 1988, the Matsuura Line was divested to the third-sector Matsuura Railway and the line was renamed the Nishi-Kyushu Line.

Passenger statistics
For the JR Kyushu station, in fiscal 2016, the station was used by an average of 888 passengers daily (boarding passengers only), and it ranked 178th among the busiest stations of JR Kyushu.

For the Matsuura Railway station, in fiscal 2015, there were a total of 142,266 boarding passengers, giving a daily average of 390 passengers.

See also
 List of railway stations in Japan

References

External links
Arita Station (JR Kyushu)

Railway stations in Saga Prefecture